Bokyem, real name Kim Bo-kyem(Hanja: 金𤣰謙, born January 31, 1988) is a South Korean YouTuber and BJ of afreecaTV. 

As of June 2020, the number of subscribers to the YouTube channel operated by Bokyem was 4.03 million, and it was the number one in the list of subscribers when limited to the Korean game YouTuber channel.

Early life 
Bokyem was born on January 31, 1988, in Seocheon-gun, Chungcheongnam-do.

Bokyem started the afreecaTV BJ in 2012 while attending Kunsan National University. In 2014, Bokyem started working on YouTube, and he has uploaded game videos.

In 2016, Bokyem also uploaded Mukbang and daily videos, increasing the number of YouTube subscribers. Most of the viewers were in their teens.

Since 2017, Bokyem has been broadcasting jointly with other BJs in Korea. And in 2019, he released a music album at melon with 'Ellin', one of the members of Crayon Pop.

In July 2020, the number of subscribers reached 4.03 million, and after that, Bokyem changed the number of subscribers to private. In August, it is estimated that the number of subscribers decreased due to controversy among many Korean YouTubers including Bokyem.

Awards 
STAR BJ 20 for 2014 Africa TV BJ Awards
2015 Africa TV BJ Awards STAR BJ 20
2016 Intel Overwatch APEX season 1 semifinals (BK Stars)
BJ 50/ THE 20/ TOP 5 / KT GiGA BMF/ BJ Grand Prize for Africa TV in 2016
2017 Africa TV BJ Grand Prize Grand Prize in the comprehensive game category
2018 Asia Model Awards Creator of the Year Award
2018 Africa TV BJ Awards
2019 Africa TV BJ Grand Prize Single-Person Media Icon Award

Incident and controversy 
In 2018, Members of the Korean male-hating community website Womad claimed distortedly that Bokyem's greeting word, 'Boiru'(), was a misogynistic word. They said that 'Bo' in 'Boiru' means Cunt.

So, Bokyem said he will take legal action against members of Womad he claims to be a disparaging expression for Women.

References

Weblinks 
 
 

1988 births
South Korean YouTubers
Living people
AfreecaTV streamers